Sarah Cornell is a Canadian actress and writer who received the 2010 LA Stage Alliance Ovation Award for Best Supporting Actress in a Stage Musical for The Producers She has also appeared in productions of Sex and the Second City Evil Dead: The Musical, and A Little Princess at Prime Stage Theatre among others.

Filmography

Film

Television

References

External link

Year of birth missing (living people)
Living people
Canadian stage actresses
21st-century Canadian actresses